X & Y is a 2018 Swedish drama film directed by Anna Odell.

At the 54th Guldbagge Awards, the film received two nominations: Best Actor in a Supporting Role (Jens Albinus) and Best Actress in a Supporting Role (Trine Dyrholm).

External links

2018 films
2018 drama films
2010s Swedish-language films
Swedish drama films
2010s Swedish films